Indonesia Corruption Watch (ICW) is an Indonesian NGO whose primary mission is to monitor and publicise incidents of corruption in Indonesia. ICW is also heavily engaged in the prevention and deterrence of corruption through education, cultural change, prosecutions and system reform. The organization was formed in Jakarta in June 1998 to prevent corruption in post-Suharto governments.

ICW's work and influence in Indonesia as a major NGO in its field has been recognized and extensively reported on since 1998 by Indonesian and major international news media. The United Nations Office on Drugs and Crime considers ICW to be "the leading NGO" focused on fighting corruption in Indonesia. The World Bank cites multiple ICW studies in various World Bank published reports and on its website. ICW's work and reports have also been cited in hundreds of academic works, books and journals about governmental and societal corruption.

Other recent indications of ICW's notability and influence include a request by the Jakarta Governor Basuki "Ahok" Tjahaja Purnama that ICW monitor the performance of government units under his administration, and arrests and reported harassment of ICW staff and activists by Indonesian police officers. On September 2, 2015,  President Joko Widodo appointed former Indonesia Corruption Watch head Teten Masduki as his new chief of staff.

Indonesian culture of corruption 

Indonesia has a serious problem with widespread corruption, which has been described as 'rampant' and impacting people from birth until death. A 2014 study and report by Transparency International (TI) as reported in the Wall Street Journal, disclosed that 72% of young Indonesians would engage in corruption for personal gain. In 2014, Indonesia placed 107 out of 175 countries on TI's Corruption Perceptions Index. A 2003 World Bank study found that between 56 and 70% of all civil service employees were seen by their colleagues to be on the take. While some attribute the current situation to a foundation of corruption laid during the reign of Indonesian strongman President Suharto, others blame a persisting 'culture of corruption' in Indonesia and the region that predates World War II.

History and role 

ICW was created on 21 June 1998, a few weeks after the resignation of President Suharto, by social activist Teten Masduki, lawyer Todung Mulya Lubis, economist Faisal Basri and other persons in the midst of a reform movement aimed at ensuring that any post-Suharto government would be democratic and free of corruption.

After the fall of Suharto it soon became apparent that the subsequent introduction of a decentralized mode of government with increased regional autonomy produced more corruption, and made its detection and control more difficult. Corruption in Indonesia was no longer organized and centralized, but became fragmented as new regional power centres and leaders emerged. In this emerging situation ICW focused on bringing cases of corruption to the public and law enforcement agencies, monitoring campaign and political finance spending in national and local elections and pushing for anti-corruption laws such as the Freedom of Information Act, the Whistleblower Protection Act, Anti-corruption Act and Election Act.

Organization 

In every term, ICW rearranged its organizational structures to reflect the organization's focus issues. In early 2019, ICW focused on seven divisions, including:

 Law and Judicial Monitoring
 Political Corruption
 Public Services and Bureaucracy Reforms
 Public Campaign
 Public Engagement
 Knowledge Management
 Finance and Administration

In previous terms, ICW had other divisions such as Research, Public Investigation, Public Fundraising, Anti-Corruption Networking, or Budget Monitoring and Analysis.

Recognition 

On 6 August 2015, Indonesia Corruption Watch was nominated as one of four finalists for the CDN$100,000 Allard Prize for International Integrity. The other finalists include John Githongo, Sergei Magnitsky and Rafael Marques de Morais.

Common news media naming error 

ICW's correct name in English is 'Indonesia Corruption Watch', as displayed in the organization's website and ICW's published reports. Archive searches of many major news organizations show that ICW's name is often erroneously reported as 'Indonesian Corruption Watch'. This inconsistent use of two names (one of them wrong) by media presents challenges to journalists and others researching ICW because two separate searches of each database are required to retrieve all news stories and available information. For instance, as of 9 August 2015 separate searches of the New York Times online archives are necessary to return 11 news stories under 'Indonesia Corruption Watch' and an additional eight news stories under 'Indonesian Corruption Watch', with Indonesia Corruption Watch (ICW) the intended subject of each news story reference. Other major news organizations' archives exhibit the same error in various proportions.

The same name error and problem is also found in government and academic publications. For instance, the World Bank 2003 report Combating Corruption in Indonesia cites both the correct and incorrect versions of ICW's name.

References

External links 
 Indonesia Corruption Watch Website (English)
 Indonesia Corruption Watch Website (Indonesian)

Political organizations based in Indonesia
Anti-corruption non-governmental organizations
Transparency (behavior)